Bickenholtz is a commune in the Moselle department in Grand Est in northeastern France.

In the 18th century there was a Mennonite commune there and one at Buchenhof, and another at Schwabenhoff.

Population

See also
 Communes of the Moselle department

References

External links
 

Communes of Moselle (department)